Sideridis peculiaris is a moth of the family Noctuidae. It is found in temperate zones of Russia and Central Asia.

References

External links
Hadeninae (Noctuidae) collection of Siberian Zoological Museum

Hadeninae
Moths described in 1888